Shobha Pandit (born 11 February 1956 in Bombay, Maharashtra) is a former Test and One Day International cricketer who represented India. She also represented Maharashtra in the domestic league. She played eight Test matches and three One Day Internationals.

References

1956 births
Living people
Cricketers from Mumbai
Maharashtra women cricketers
India women One Day International cricketers
India women Test cricketers
Indian women cricketers
Sportswomen from Maharashtra